Regulation CF, also known as Regulation Crowdfunding or Reg CF is a section of the United States Code, in particular 17 U.S.C. § 227 (2021) dealing with equity crowdfunding. This section of the law originated with Title III of the 2012 JOBS Act which went into effect on May 16, 2016. It was amended in November 2020, and those amendments effectively became law in 2021.

Several U.S. platforms, called funding portals, currently facilitate Reg CF investments, including SeedInvest and Wefunder.

See also
 Regulation A

References 

Crowdfunding
United States federal legislation